Schools in Worthing are provided by West Sussex County Council and by a number of independent providers. Both non-denominational and Church of England maintained schools were previously organised along three tier lines, with students transferring from a first school at age 8 to a middle school, and then starting High School at age 12. This system was introduced in 1973 as part of a move to reorganise schools to provide comprehensive education across West Sussex. In 2015, schools returned to the more common pattern of transfer at the end of a Key Stage.

The local authority provides 22 primary schools (through a combination of infant, junior and primary schools) and six high schools, alongside a primary and a secondary special school.

In July 2013 it was announced that funding had been agreed by central government that would allow a new 900-place secondary school to be built in Broadwater, with a view to changing the age of transfer between primary and secondary schools.

Maintained schools

Primary schools

Secondary schools

Independent schools

External links

List of educational establishments in Worthing (West Sussex County Council)

References

Buildings and structures in Worthing
Schools in West Sussex
Worthing